Montreat may refer to:

Montreat, North Carolina, United States
Montreat Conference Center, located in Montreat, North Carolina, United States
Montreat College, located in Montreat, North Carolina, United States